Sella may refer to:

Places
 Sella, Alicante, a municipality in Spain
 Sella, Greece, a village in Greece
 Sella group, mountains in the Dolomites
 Sella River (Bay of Biscay), Asturias, Spain
 Sella River (Guam)

Other uses
 Sella (surname)
 Sella, a character in Fate/stay night
 Sella class destroyer, a type of ship used by the Italian navy
 Sella (grape), a French wine grape that is also known as Peloursin
 Sella turcica, a depression in the human skull
 sella curulis (Latin), the curule chair of ancient Rome
 Sella Italiano, a horse breed
 Sella, an anatomical term referring to part of the noseleaf of horseshoe bats

See also
Sela (disambiguation)
Selah (disambiguation)